Golden Favorites is an album by American country music singer Ernest Tubb, released in 1961 (see 1961 in music). The songs are re-recordings of previous releases by Tubb.

Reception

In his AllMusic review, George Bedard wrote of the album "These re-recordings of older material are well-done, but it would be better to have the originals."

Track listing
"I'll Get Along Somehow" (Ernest Tubb)
"Slippin' Around" (Floyd Tillman)
"Filipino Baby" (Billy Cox, Clarke Van Ness)
"When the World Has Turned You Down" (Tubb)
"Have You Ever Been Lonely (Have You Ever Been Blue)" (Peter De Rose, Billy Hill)
"There's a Little Bit of Everything in Texas" (Tubb)
"Walking the Floor Over You" (Tubb)
"Driftwood on the River" (Bob Miller, John Klenner)
"There's Nothing More to Say" (Tubb)
"Rainbow at Midnight" (Lost John Miller)
"I'll Always Be Glad to Take You Back" (Tubb)
"Let's Say Goodbye Like We Said Hello" (Tubb, Ernest Skinner)

Personnel
Ernest Tubb – vocals, guitar
Billy Byrd – guitar
Grady Martin – guitar
Buddy Emmons – pedal steel guitar
Jack Drake – bass
Buddy Harman – drums
Farris Coursey – drums
Floyd Cramer – piano
Tommy Jackson – fiddle
The Jordanaires – background vocals
The Anita Kerr Singers – background vocals

References

Ernest Tubb albums
1961 albums
Albums produced by Owen Bradley
Decca Records albums